Verity Mary Barton (born 6 August 1985) is an Australian politician. She was the LNP member of the Legislative Assembly of Queensland for Broadwater from 2012 to 2017. She defeated Peta-Kaye Croft at the 2012 state election and was re-elected at the 2015 election, before losing LNP preselection for the 2017 election to former MP David Crisafulli.

Barton was educated at All Hallows' School in Brisbane. She went on to further studies in law and politics at Bond University on the Gold Coast and Northwestern University School of Law in Chicago, Illinois. Prior to her election she worked in the retail industry and also served as a media consultant for Senator George Brandis.

Political career

Barton joined LNP-predecessor the former Liberal Party at 17. She has held various senior local branch positions, including chair of the Broadwater State Electorate Council. She has been a member of the LNP State Council and was a member of the Young LNP Management Committee from 2010 until 2012. Barton is the granddaughter of former member for Kurilpa, Clive Hughes.

Aged 26 years, 7 months and 18 days old when first elected, Barton was the youngest woman ever elected to the Queensland Parliament. Throughout the 54th Parliament, Barton was a member of the Legal Affairs and Community Safety Committee and was appointed as Temporary Chair of Committees, a role which saw her serve as an acting Deputy Speaker in the Parliament.

Ms Barton is a strong monarchist having made a speech to parliament in May 2013 in support of the Succession to the Crown Bill 2013 referencing her admiration of the British Royal Family and ending her comments with "God bless Queensland, God bless Australia and God save the Queen."

In her maiden speech to Queensland Parliament, Verity Barton stated she was a "proud conservative" and listed Sir Robert Menzies, Margaret Thatcher, Ronald Reagan and John Howard as her "key political influences." In the same speech, Ms Barton also made reference to her strong Catholic faith.

On 8 January 2015, it was revealed that Barton had her driving licence suspended in both 2012 and 2013 after failing to pay road tolls, and that she had driven while unlicensed. After being reprimanded at LNP headquarters, she issued a statement apologising for her actions and telling her electors that she was still willing to serve them if given the opportunity at the forthcoming election. Queensland Premier Campbell Newman said there was no need to discipline her, despite the 2012 resignation of the then LNP police minister, David Gibson, for driving while his licence was suspended.

In May 2017, Barton lost the LNP preselection for the Broadwater to former Newman Government Minister, David Crisafulli. In 2018, Barton relocated to London to take up an appointment as personal assistant to the Australian High Commissioner to the UK, George Brandis.

References

1985 births
Living people
Bond University alumni
Northwestern University Pritzker School of Law alumni
Australian monarchists
Liberal National Party of Queensland politicians
Members of the Queensland Legislative Assembly
People from the Gold Coast, Queensland
21st-century Australian politicians
21st-century Australian women politicians
Women members of the Queensland Legislative Assembly
People educated at All Hallows' School